NGC 7075 is an elliptical galaxy with a radio emission located about 290 million light-years away in the constellation of Grus.  NGC 7075 was discovered by astronomer John Herschel on September 4, 1834.

See also 
 List of NGC objects (7001–7840)
 Radio galaxy
 M87
 NGC 7016

References

External links 

Elliptical galaxies
Radio galaxies
Grus (constellation)
7075
66895
Astronomical objects discovered in 1834